Suez Sporting Club, also known as Suez Montakhab, is an Egyptian football club based in Suez, Egypt. The club is currently playing in the Egyptian Second Division, the second-highest league in the Egyptian football league system.

History
After two clubs of Suez city were relegated to the Egyptian Second Division (the first was Ittihad Suez club in season 1965/1966 and the second was Suez El-Riyadi club in season 1966/1967) the two clubs joined to found Suez Montakhab Club in 1967.
 Ittihad Suez club played in the Egyptian Premier League for ten seasons starting from season 1955/1956.
 Suez El-Riyadi club played in the Egyptian Premier League for five seasons starting from season 1957/1958 and reached the final of the Egypt Cup in season 1964/1965 but lost the final against Tersana 4/1.
 Suez Montakhab played in the Egyptian Premier League for fifteen seasons starting from season 1974/1975 and reached the final of the Egypt Cup in season 1989/1990 but lost the final against Al-Mokawloon Al-Arab 2/1 and won fourth place in the League Cup in season 1999/2000 when Suez Montakhab beat Ma'aden 2/1. The EFA abolished this result because Suez Montakhab used an ineligible player and Ma'aden won the third place.

Since that time, Suez Montakhab has played in the Egyptian Second Division.

Colours
Suez Montakhab's colours, white and blue, come from Suez's flag. Suez Montakhab's  home kit is a white shirt with  blue shorts. The team's away kit is a blue shirt with white shorts.

Stadium
Suez Montakhab formerly played their home games at Suez Stadium.

Suez Stadium
 Capacity : 25,000
 Site : Zayteyat, Suez

In addition to Suez Montakhab, the Suez Stadium is the main stadium for Petrojet and Suez Cement as well.

Performance in the Egyptian Premier League

Ittihad Suez's history in the Egyptian Premier League

Suez El-Riyadi's History in The Egyptian Premier League

Suez Montakhab's History in the Egyptian Premier League

Best achievements
 Egyptian Premier League
 Ittihad Suez : 4th : 1957–58, 1962–63
 Suez El-Riyadi : 6th : 1963–64
 Suez Montakhab : 6th : 1976–77, 1994–95
 Egyptian Cup
 Suez El-Riyadi : Final : 1964–65
 Suez Montakhab : Final : 1989–90
 Egyptian League Cup
 Suez Montakhab : 4th : 1999–00

Board of directors

Players and coaching staff

Coaching staff

Current First Team squad

References
 Suez El-Riyadi's and Suez Montakhab's Premier League History www.egyptianfootball.net
 Ittihad Suez's Premier League History www.egyptianfootball.net

Egyptian Second Division
Football clubs in Egypt
Sports clubs in Egypt
1923 establishments in Egypt